Carex munipoorensis is a tussock-forming species of perennial sedge in the family Cyperaceae. It is native to parts of Asia from Assam in the west to Myanmar in the east.

See also
List of Carex species

References

munipoorensis
Plants described in 1894
Taxa named by Charles Baron Clarke
Flora of Myanmar
Flora of Assam (region)